Barlow's lark (Calendulauda barlowi) is a species of lark in the family Alaudidae. It is found in Namibia and South Africa where its natural habitat is subtropical or tropical dry shrubland. It is threatened by habitat loss.

Taxonomy and systematics
Originally, Barlow's lark was classified as belonging to the genus Pseudammomanes, then later by Mirafra and Certhilauda, until moved to Calendulauda in 2009. Formerly, some authorities considered Barlow's lark as a subspecies of either the Karoo lark (as Certhilauda albescens barlowi) or the dune lark (as Certhilauda erythrochlamys barlowi). Not all authorities recognize each of these re-classifications.

The common name and scientific name commemorate the South African businessman and conservationist Charles Sydney Barlow.

Subspecies 
Three subspecies are recognized: 
 Calendulauda barlowi barlowi (Roberts, 1937): Found from the Koichab River to Aus (south-western Namibia)
 Calendulauda barlowi patae (Macdonald, 1953): Found in coastal south-western Namibia to north-western South Africa
 Calendulauda barlowi cavei (Macdonald, 1953): Found in inland south-western Namibia to north-western South Africa. Some authorities consider Cave's lark to be a separate species.

References

Barlow's lark
Birds of Southern Africa
Barlow's lark
Taxonomy articles created by Polbot
Taxobox binomials not recognized by IUCN